Molochio is a comune (municipality) in the Province of Reggio Calabria in the Italian region Calabria, located about  southwest of Catanzaro and about  northeast of Reggio Calabria. It is known for "having one of the highest prevalences of centenarians in the world".

Molochio borders the following municipalities: Ciminà, Cittanova, Taurianova, Terranova Sappo Minulio, Varapodio.

Demographic evolution

References

Cities and towns in Calabria